This is a list of meet results for USA Masters Diving between 1980 and 1984.

1980

Spring Nationals 

1980 National AAU Masters Indoor Diving Championships, May 24–25, 1980, The Woodlands, Texas. Dave McKeehan, meet director. This was another year for rule changes. 70-79 was broken down into 5 year age brackets and the Grand Masters events were expanded to GMI-21-34, GMII-35-49, and GMIII-50 & up. The tower events were also broken down into 10 year age brackets. 1980 was also the start of the Jolly John Sable Award, in loving memory of Jolly John Sable, a great and unique senior masters diver, who passed away in March 1980 at the age of 76. Awarded each year to the male and female diver displaying outstanding performance in National diving competition.

Summer Nationals
1980 National AAU Masters Outdoor Diving Championships, August 29–31, 1980, Clovis, California. Bill McAlister, meet director.

1981

Spring Nationals

Diving competitions in the United States